Christopher L. Relf (born May 26, 1989) is an American football quarterback. He played college football for the Mississippi State University Bulldogs.

High school 
Relf passed for 1,400 yards and 13 touchdowns at Carver High School in Montgomery, Alabama, as a junior.

College career 

Had a breakout performance against Ole Miss in the season finale of the 2009 season. In the 2011 Progressive Gator Bowl against the University of Michigan Wolverines, Relf completed 18 of his 23 passes for 281 yards and 3 touchdowns. He also ran for 49 yards and 1 touchdown and was named the MVP of the game.  As a senior, he led Mississippi State to the Music City Bowl where they defeated Wake Forest 23–17, marking the first back to back bowl appearances for the Bulldogs since the 1999–2000 seasons.

Relf's 3,297 passing yards are 10th in school history. His 28 passing touchdowns place him 7th.

Statistics

References 

1989 births
Living people
Players of American football from Montgomery, Alabama
American football quarterbacks
Mississippi State Bulldogs football players